Majority of the population in Rayagada happen to be Hindus. Temples reflect the synthesis of art and religion in Hinduism so far as the religious custom is concerned.

Introduction 
Odisha is a land of temples and Rayagada is no exception. Various temples enhance its scenic beauty and attract tourists throughout the year. The list of Hindu temple in and around Rayagada is quite long.

 Balunkeswar Temple, Rayagada
 Chatikona Shiva temple
 Gayatri Temple at MITS College, Rayagada
 Hanuman Temple near daily market, Rayagada
 Jagannath Temple, Rayagada
 Laxminarayan temple, Therubali
 Lord Venketeshwar Temple, Rayagada
 Maa Majhighariani Termple, Rayagada
 Maa Mangala Temple, Rayagada
 Maa Santoshi Temple near daily market, Rayagada
 Maa Markama Temple at Bissamcuttack
 Maa kali Temple, Rayagada
 Mutyalamma Temple, Rayagada
 Paikapada Shiva temple
 Rama Temple, Gunupur
 Radhakrushna Temple in MITS Campus
 Radhakrushna Temple of Brahmin street, Rayagada
 Swamy Ayappa Temple at Bypass Road, Gunupur
 Shiridi Sai Temple at Railway Colony, Rayagada
 Sri Rama Temple, Rayagada
 Sri Vinayaka Temple, Rayagada
 Swamy Ayyappa Temple, Rayagada
 Hanumana Temple at Church Road, Gunupur
 Jagannath Temple, Gunupur
 Radhakrushna Temple at Gunupur
 Neelamani Durga Temple, Gunupur
 Dakhina Kali Temple at Gunupur
 Shiva Temple(Baghua Deula), Gunupur
 Bhimshankar Jyotirlinga Temple at Bhimpur
 Shiridi Sai Temple, Gunupur
 Satya Sai Temple, Gunupur
 Maa Manikeshwari Temple, Gunupur
 Maa Mangala Temple at Gunupur
 Sri Rama Temple, Rayagada
 Sri Vasavi Kanyaka Parameswari Temple, Rayagada
 Shiva Temple at Jyotimahal Chouk, Rayagada
 Santoshi Maa Temple, Rayagada
 Satabhauni Temple at Rayagada
 Trinath Temple, Rayagada
 Gayatri Temple at Rayagada
 Nilakantheswar temple, Padmapur
 Maa Manikeswari Temple, Kashipur
 Kanyaka Parameswari Temple, Gunupur
 Lord Ganesh Temple, Gunupure
 Sri Mrutyunjaya & Meenakshi Temple, Gunupur
 Shiva Temple, Gunupur
 Jagannath Temple of Durgi-odisha
 Shiv Temple of Rayat Colony, Rayagada
 Radha Krishna Temple, Durgi
 Radha Krushan Temple, Lihuri, Gunupur (The temple is situated in Andhra Pradesh, but in the Border of Rayagada district)
 Maa Banadurga Temple, Rayagada
 Trinath Temple, Padmapur
 Satya Narayana Swami Temple, Rayagada
 Giri Gobardhan Temple, Rayagada
 Lord Venketeswar Temple, Rayagada
 Lord Rama Temple, Rayagada(near Kasturi Nagara)
 Shiva Temple, Rayagada(Kasturi Nagara)
 Omkarnath Temple, Chekaguda(Rayagada)
 Sankeswari Temple, Sankesh, Rayagada
 Shiv Temple at Rohita Colony, Rayagada
 Maa Bhadra Kali Temple, Rayagada
 Satsang Vihar, Rayagada
 Radhakrishna Temple at Bhaleri near Gunupur
 Lord Hanuman Temple at Kailashpur(Rayagada)

Gallery

See also
 List of Hindu temples

References

Hindu temples in Rayagada district
Rayagada
Lists of tourist attractions in Odisha